Calibre is a 2018 British thriller film written and directed by Matt Palmer. After a debut at the Edinburgh International Film Festival, it was released on 29 June 2018 on Netflix. It also had a limited release in select Curzon Cinemas in the UK from 21 October to 16 November 2018. The film is set in Scotland and concerns incidents on a hunting trip to the remote Scottish Highlands, and stars Jack Lowden and Martin McCann.

Plot
An aggressive Edinburgh businessman, Marcus, takes his boarding-school friend, Vaughn, whose fiancée is newly pregnant, on a weekend hunting in the Scottish Highlands. Vaughn has never hunted before. They spend the evening at a village pub, where they meet Logan, a community leader who bemoans the village's weak economy; and two young women, Kara and Iona. After dancing and drinking, Marcus leaves with Kara, despite being warned to stay away. Vaughn and Iona nearly kiss but Vaughn mentions his pregnant fiancée, so they have another drink instead.

Early next morning, Marcus rouses a hungover Vaughn for their hunt. On the way, Vaughn deduces Marcus has used cocaine and chastises him. Vaughn realises he has forgotten ammunition for his rifle, so Marcus lets him borrow one of his guns, despite this violating the strict firearm laws. On the hunt, the pair happen upon a deer in a clearing, and Vaughn aims at a doe’s head; but it suddenly turns, causing Vaughn to shoot and kill a boy, unseen behind the deer. The boy's father arrives and, in a fit of grief, picks up Vaughn's gun and points it at him; but Marcus shoots the man. Vaughn wants to tell the police about the incident but Marcus convinces him they will be arrested as murderers. Marcus hides the bodies and they drive off, hoping to claim that they were hunting in another area. However, Marcus is told by a petrol station owner that Logan said no other hunters are around and convinces a traumatised Vaughn they can only protect themselves by returning after nightfall and burying the bodies.

They return to the village and are invited to dinner by Logan and his cousin Al; Logan asks if Marcus can help him find investors who might revitalise the community. At night, they bury the bodies. Marcus recovers the bullets, using a knife to dig Vaughn's bullet out of the boy's skull, over Vaughn's objections. They return just before dawn but are spotted by the B&B owner's young son.
The next day, their departure is thwarted when Brian, another of Logan's brothers, slashes their tires and attacks Marcus for sleeping with Kara and giving her cocaine. At the garage, the mechanic tells Marcus the repairs will take a day. They return to the pub to hire a taxi, but find the driver drunk. On Logan's orders, Brian offers an aggressive and insincere apology, while complaining that the locals are beholden to "city twats" because they might bring in money. While Marcus is in the toilet, Vaughn speaks to Al and Iona and realizes the deceased were Logan's nephew and brother-in-law. Al's suspicions are raised when Marcus, upon returning, asks about "them" despite having only heard that Logan's nephew was missing.

Logan asks them to help with the search, which they accept for fear of arousing suspicion. A dog leads the party to the bodies. While the group digs them up, Marcus and Vaughn attempt to flee, but their fuel tank is ruptured by a bullet from Brian. Fleeing on foot, Vaughn stumbles and is injured by the dog, which Marcus stabs to death. As the group closes in, Marcus leaves Vaughn. Brian savagely beats Vaughn before being pulled off by Logan; the rest pursue Marcus.

Logan and Brian take Vaughn to a farm, where he confesses. Brian wants to kill them but Logan, realizing their deaths would be punished, insists on involving the police instead. Brian objects, claiming there is insufficient evidence and Vaughn will change his story to protect himself. As Brian moves to kill Vaughn, they hear the group has caught Marcus. Vaughn is locked in a guarded barn.

The next morning, Logan gives Vaughn an ultimatum: he must either kill Marcus, or Brian will kill them both. Vaughn initially refuses, even after being reminded of his fiancée and unborn child, and breaks down in tears. Eventually, at gunpoint, he kills Marcus. The locals hide Marcus's jeep. Before Vaughn's fiancée arrives, Logan goes over the cover story with Vaughn, instructing him to tell the police that Marcus drove north and his relatives disappeared.

Months later, Vaughan's fiancée turns on the bedside light to find him awake, sitting in a chair in the dark. She asks if he's okay. He says he's fine, despite clearly being far from it, and returns the question. They hear the baby start to fuss. Vaughn gets up and goes to comfort his crying child. He cradles him, but has a haunted look.

Cast
 Jack Lowden as Vaughn
 Martin McCann as Marcus
 Tony Curran as Logan McClay
 Ian Pirie as Brian McClay
 Kate Bracken as Iona
 Kitty Lovett as Kara
 Cal MacAninch as Al McClay
 Cameron Jack as Frank McClay
 Donald McLeary as Grant McClay

Production
The film was nine years in the making, and began filming in November 2016.

In May 2018, it was reported that Calibre had been picked up by Netflix for distribution and would first world premiere at the Edinburgh International Film Festival.

Release
Calibre premiered at the Edinburgh International Film Festival on 22 June 2018. The film was released worldwide on 29 June 2018 by Netflix. It also had a limited release in select Curzon Cinemas in the UK from 21 October to 16 November 2018.

Critical response
Calibre has received positive reviews. Metacritic gives the film a weighted average rating of 76 out of 100, based on 7 critics, indicating "generally favorable reviews".

Guy Lodge of Variety called the film "a sensationally well-executed nerve-mangler", and gave high praise to "the level of craft and confidence on display in all aspects of Calibre, from [Matt] Palmer’s clean, lean scripting to Márk Györi’s baleful, autumn-chill camerawork to a lead performance of through-the-wringer commitment by rising Scots star Jack Lowden." Neil Young of The Hollywood Reporter noted that "a mature social concern about the plight of remote, economically marginal but tightly knit communities, gives Calibre a pungent, intriguing layer of ambiguity that only sharpens the acute pain of the awful events so skillfully depicted. Both Ken Loach and Wes Craven would surely approve." Catherine Renton of The Edinburgh Reporter concluded a very positive review of the film by claiming "I was exhausted but exhilarated after a taut 100 minutes of drama, and I can't wait to do it all again..."

Accolades

References

External links
 
 

2018 films
2018 thriller films
English-language Netflix original films
Films set in Edinburgh
Films set in Scotland
Films shot in Edinburgh
Films shot in Scotland
British thriller films
2010s English-language films
2010s British films